Krakatoa, also transcribed , is a caldera in the Sunda Strait between the islands of Java and Sumatra in the Indonesian province of Lampung. The caldera is part of a volcanic island group (Krakatoa archipelago) comprising four islands. Two, Lang and Verlaten, are remnants of a previous volcanic edifice destroyed in eruptions long before the famous 1883 eruption; another, Rakata, is the remnant of a much larger island destroyed in the 1883 eruption.

In 1927, a fourth island, Anak Krakatoa, or "Child of Krakatoa", emerged from the caldera formed in 1883. There has been new eruptive activity since the late 20th century, with a large collapse causing a deadly tsunami in December 2018.

Historical significance 

The most notable eruptions of Krakatoa culminated in a series of massive explosions over 26–27 August 1883, which were among the most violent volcanic events in recorded history.

With an estimated Volcanic Explosivity Index (VEI) of 6, the eruption was equivalent to —about 13,000 times the nuclear yield of the Little Boy bomb (13 to 16 kt) that devastated Hiroshima, Japan, during World War II, and four times the yield of Tsar Bomba, the most powerful nuclear device ever detonated at 50 Mt.

According to the official records of the Dutch East Indies colony, 165 villages and towns were destroyed near Krakatoa, and 132 were seriously damaged. At least 36,417 people died, and many more thousands were injured, mostly from the tsunamis that followed the explosion. The eruption destroyed two-thirds of the island of Krakatoa.

Eruptions in the area since 1927 have built a new island at the same location, named Anak Krakatau (which is Indonesian for "Child of Krakatoa"). Periodic eruptions have continued since, with recent eruptions in 2009, 2010, 2011, and 2012, and a major collapse in 2018.

Etymology 
One of the earliest mentions of the name Krakatoa is in the Old Sundanese text Bujangga Manik, which was probably written in western Java in the late 15th century. Here Krakatoa is referred to as "the island of Rakata, a mountain in the middle of the sea" (pulo Rakata gunung ti tengah sagara, f. 27v). Although there are earlier descriptions in European sources of an island in the Sunda Strait with a "pointed mountain," the earliest mention of Krakatoa by name in the western world was on a 1611 map by Lucas Janszoon Waghenaer, who labelled the island "Pulo Carcata" (pulo is the Sundanese word for "island"). About two dozen variants have been found, including Crackatouw, Cracatoa, and Krakatao (in an older Portuguese-based spelling). The first known appearance of the spelling Krakatau was by Wouter Schouten, who passed by "the high tree-covered island of Krakatau" in October 1658.

The origin of the Indonesian name Krakatau is uncertain. The main theories are:
 From Sanskrit karka or karkaṭa or karkaṭaka, meaning "lobster" or "crab". The abbreviated form rakaṭa also means "crab" in the Old Javanese language. The fact that the earliest recorded mentions of the word closely resemble the pronunciation of these words for crab (rakata in Bujangga Manik and carcata in Waghenaer's map) makes this Sanskrit etymology the most likely origin of the word.
 Onomatopoeia, imitating the noise made by cockatoos (Kakatoes) which used to inhabit the island. However, Van den Berg points out that these birds are found only in the "eastern part of the archipelago" (meaning the Lesser Sundas, east of Java, on the other side of the Wallace Line).
 The closest Malay word is kelakatu, meaning "white-winged ant". Furneaux points out that in pre-1883 maps, Krakatoa does somewhat resemble an ant seen from above, with Lang and Verlaten lying to the sides like wings.
 Van den Berg (1884) recites a story that Krakatau was the result of a linguistic error. According to the legend, a visiting ship's captain asked a local inhabitant the island's name, and the latter replied, "Kaga tau" (Aku enggak tahu)—a Jakartan/Betawinese slang phrase meaning "I don't know". This story is largely discounted; it closely resembles other linguistic myths about the origin of the word kangaroo and the name of the Yucatán Peninsula.

The Smithsonian Institution's Global Volcanism Program cites the Indonesian name, Krakatau, as the correct name, but says that Krakatoa is often employed.

Geographical setting 

Indonesia has over 130 active volcanoes, the most of any nation. They make up the axis of the Indonesian island arc system produced by northeastward subduction of the Indo-Australian Plate. A majority of these volcanoes lie along Indonesia's two largest islands, Java and Sumatra. These two islands are separated by the Sunda Strait located at a bend in the axis of the island arc. Krakatau is directly above the subduction zone of the Eurasian Plate and the Indo-Australian Plate where the plate boundaries make a sharp change of direction, possibly resulting in an unusually weak crust in the region.

Pre-1883 history 
At some point in prehistory, an earlier caldera-forming eruption had occurred, leaving as remnants Verlaten (or Sertung); Lang (also known as Rakata Kecil, or Panjang); Poolsche Hoed ("Polish Hat"); and the base of Rakata. Later, at least two more cones (Perboewatan and Danan) formed and eventually joined with Rakata, forming the main island of Krakatoa. There were also the tree-covered islet near Lang (Poolsche Hoed) and several small rocky islets or banks between Krakatoa and Verlaten.

There were three volcanic cones on Krakatoa island: Rakata, to the south; Danan, near the center; and Perboewatan, to the north.

AD 416 event 
The Javanese Book of Kings (Pustaka Raja), a 19th-century compilation of historical traditions from Central Java, records that in the year 338 Śaka (416 AD):

The Pustaka Raja does not draw on primary sources for its description of this event, and its historical reliability is highly dubious. It is therefore impossible to verify its description of this eruption. There is no geological evidence of a Krakatoa eruption of this size around that time; it may describe the loss of land which previously joined Java to Sumatra across what is now the narrow east end of the Sunda Strait; or it may be a mistaken date, referring to a later eruption in 535 AD, for which there is some corroborating historical evidence.

AD 535 event 
David Keys, Ken Wohletz, and others have postulated that a violent volcanic eruption, possibly of Krakatoa, in 535 was responsible for the global climate changes of 535–536. Keys explores what he believes to be the radical and far-ranging global effects of such a putative 6th-century eruption in his book Catastrophe: An Investigation into the Origins of the Modern World. This eruption was believed to have been even more violent than Krakatoa's 1883 eruption, and also the one that created Krakatoa's original caldera, which resulted in the creation of Verlaten Island and Lang Island. However, there are other explanations for the climate change, including an eruption of Ilopango in El Salvador, in Central America.

Middle Ages 
Thornton mentions that Krakatoa was known as "The Fire Mountain" during Java's Sailendra dynasty, with records of seven eruptive events between the 9th and 16th centuries. These have been tentatively dated as having occurred in 850, 950, 1050, 1150, 1320, and 1530.

1680 

In February 1681, Johann Wilhelm Vogel, a Dutch mining engineer at Salida, Sumatra (near Padang), on his way to Batavia (now Jakarta) passed through the Sunda Strait. In his diary he wrote:

Vogel spent several months in Batavia, returning to Sumatra in November 1681. On the same ship were several other Dutch travellers, including Elias Hesse, a writer. Hesse's journal reports:

The eruption was also reported by a Bengali sea captain, who wrote of the event later, but had not recorded it at the time in the ship's log. Neither Vogel nor Hesse mention Krakatoa in any real detail in their other passages, and no other travellers at the time mention an eruption or evidence of one. (In November 1681, a pepper crop was being offered for sale by inhabitants.)

Simon Winchester maintains, in his 2003 book Krakatoa: The Day the World Exploded: August 27, 1883, that the 1680 eruption was depicted in an eighteenth-century etching by Dutch cartographer Jan van Schley called Het Brandende Eiland, "The Burning Island," writing that "it was a depiction, without a doubt, of the otherwise little-chronicled eruption that supposedly took place in 1680."

In 1880, Verbeek investigated a fresh unweathered lava flow at the northern coast of Perboewatan, which could not have been more than two centuries old.

Visit by HMS Discovery 
They found a freshwater and a hot spring on the island. They described the natives who then lived on the island as "friendly" and made several sketches (In his journal, John Ledyard calls the island "Cocoterra").

Visit by USS Peacock 
Edmund Roberts calls the island Crokatoa in his journal. A paraphrased account follows: 

On 8 September 1832, US sloop-of-war Peacock anchored off the north end, also visiting Lang Island, in search of inhabitants, fresh water, and yams. It was found difficult to land anywhere, due to a heavy surf and to the coral having extended itself to a considerable distance from the shore. Hot springs boiling furiously up, through many fathoms of water, were found on the eastern side of Krakatoa,  from the shore. Roberts, Captain Geisinger, and marine lieutenant Fowler visited Forsaken island, having mistaken the singing of locusts for the sound of running water. The boat glided over crystal clear water, over an extensive and highly beautiful submarine garden. The hillsides were typical of tropical climate; large flocks of parrots, monkeys in great variety, wild-mango and orange groves—a superb scene of plants and flowers of every description, glowing in vivid tints of purple, red, blue, brown, and green—but not water or provisions.

Dutch activity 
In 1620, the Dutch set up a naval station on the islands and somewhat later a shipyard was built. Sometime in the late 17th century, an attempt was made to establish a pepper plantation on Krakatoa, but the islands were generally ignored by the Dutch East India Company. In 1809, a penal colony was established at an unspecified location, which was in operation for about a decade.

Several surveys and mariners' charts were made, and the islands were little explored or studied. An 1854 map of the islands was used in an English chart, which shows some difference from a Dutch chart made in 1874. In July 1880, Rogier Verbeek made an official survey of the islands, but was allowed to spend only a few hours there. He was able to collect samples from several places, and his investigation later proved important in judging the geological impact of the 1883 eruption.

1883 eruption 

While seismic activity around the volcano was intense in the years preceding the cataclysmic 1883 eruption, a series of lesser eruptions began on 20 May 1883. The volcano released huge plumes of steam and ash lasting until late August.

On 27 August, a series of four huge explosions almost destroyed the island. The pressure wave from the third and most violent explosion was recorded on barographs around the world. Several barographs recorded the wave seven times over the course of five days: four times with the wave travelling away from the volcano to its antipodal point, and three times travelling back to the volcano; the wave rounded the globe three and a half times. The sound of the eruption was so loud it was reported that if anyone was within , they would have gone deaf.

The combined effects of pyroclastic flows, volcanic ashes, and tsunamis had disastrous results in the region and worldwide. The death toll recorded by the Dutch authorities was 36,417, although some sources put the estimate at more than 120,000. There are numerous documented reports of groups of human skeletons floating across the Indian Ocean on rafts of volcanic pumice and washing up on the east coast of Africa up to a year after the eruption.

Aftermath

Anak Krakatau 

Verbeek, in his report on the eruption, predicted that any new activity would manifest itself in the region which had been between Perboewatan and Danan. This prediction came true on 29 December 1927, when a submarine lava dome in the area of Perboewatan showed evidence of eruptions (an earlier event in the same area had been reported in June 1927). A new island volcano rose above the waterline a few days later. The eruptions were initially of pumice and ash, and that island and the two islands that followed were quickly eroded away by the sea. Eventually, a fourth island, named Anak Krakatau (meaning "child of Krakatoa" in Indonesian), broke water in August 1930 and produced lava flows more quickly than the waves could erode them.

Political 
On October 2, 1883, five weeks after the eruption, a Dutch soldier was repeatedly stabbed by a bearded, white-robed man while paying for tobacco in the small town of Serang. The would-be assassin was never captured, but a similarly-dressed man attacked a sentry at the garrison six weeks later, blaming the Dutch for bringing divine vengeance upon the area. The "extreme religious zeal" noted by the man's interrogators seen as widespread, and historians suggest it was exploited by rising Muslim conservatives and anticolonial leaders (such as Abdul Karim Amrullah) to foment the Banten Peasant's Revolt in 1888, and to prey upon the Dutch conscience made uneasy by Max Havelaar and subsequent revelations of abuses. 

The explosion was the first natural disaster in history whose effects were definitively felt worldwide and whose cause was known, following the development of transoceanic communication cables. Winchester suggests the disaster marks the birth of an era of global awareness.

Biological research 
The islands have become a major case study of island biogeography and founder populations in an ecosystem being built from the ground up in an environment virtually cleaned.

The islands had been little studied or biologically surveyed before the 1883 catastrophe—only two pre-1883 biological collections are known: one of plant specimens and the other part of a shell collection. The pre-1883 fauna is virtually unknown but was probably typical of the smaller islands in the area.

Botanical studies 
From a biological perspective, the Krakatau problem refers to the question of whether the islands were completely sterilized by the 1883 eruption or whether some indigenous life survived. When the first researchers reached the islands in May 1884, the only living thing they found was a spider in a crevice on the south side of Rakata. Life quickly recolonized the islands, however; Verbeek's visit in October 1884 found grass shoots already growing. The eastern side of the island has been extensively vegetated by trees and shrubs, presumably brought there as seeds washed up by ocean currents or carried in birds' droppings (or brought by natives and scientific investigators). However, the floral ecosystem on Rakata is considerably vulnerable to environmental factors, and has been damaged by recent eruptions at Anak Krakatau.

Handl's occupancy 
In 1914, plans were to set aside Rakata as a nature preserve. Handl took up residence on the south coast of Rakata, where he built a house and planted a garden along with "four European families and about 30 coolies". Handl found un-burned wood below the 1883 ash deposits while digging, and fresh water was found below . He and his entourage stayed there for four years, but left due to "violation of the terms of the lease." It is his party that is believed to have inadvertently introduced the black rat to the island, which quickly proliferated.

Conservation
Krakatoa was declared as a nature reserve in 1921, corresponding to IUCN management category Ia (strict nature reserve). Along with several other nature reserves, it was proposed as a national park in 1980. In 1991, "Ujung Kulon National Park and Krakatau Nature Reserve" was inscribed as an UNESCO World Heritage Site, matching Natural criteria (vii) and (x). Ujung Kulon National Park was officially established in 1992, including Krakatoa.

In popular culture

A large part of the 1947 children's novel The Twenty-One Balloons by William Pene du Bois takes place on Krakatoa, just before and then during the 1883 eruption. In Pene du Bois's tale, 25 families have established a fanciful colony drawing vast wealth from fictional diamond mines on the island until the eruption scatters the inhabitants and destroys the mines.

Krakatoa has been featured as a subject and a part of the story in various television and film dramas. In the 1953 film Fair Wind to Java, an American sea captain and a pirate leader race one another to recover a fortune in diamonds hidden on Krakatoa, which begins its final eruption as they search the island for the treasure. 

The island was a prominent part of the plot of '"Crack of Doom," episode six of the Irwin Allen television series The Time Tunnel in 1966

It was also featured as the main part of the story line in the 1969 film, Krakatoa, East of Java (retitled Volcano in a re-release in the 1970s; the title contains a rather large geographical error, as Krakatoa is west of Java), which depicts an effort to salvage a priceless cargo of pearls located perilously close to the erupting volcano.

Krakatoa is referenced in SpongeBob SquarePants by the character Squidward Tentacles. In the episode Mermaid Man and Barnacle Boy V, Squidward adopts the persona of a superhero named Captain Magma whose catchphrase is "Krakatoa".

An Indonesian martial arts action film, Krakatau (1977), starring Dicky Zulkarnaen and Advent Bangun, set the story on the mountain. 

It has been the subject of a 2006 television drama, Krakatoa: Volcano of Destruction and again in 2008 as Krakatoa.

In Klaus Teuber's board game Seafarers of Catan, the "Krakatoa Variant" is a scenario involving an island composed of three volcano tiles.

In 1973, the American progressive rock band Styx released a spoken-word track called "Krakatoa" on its album The Serpent Is Rising. Written by then-guitarist John Curulewski along with Paul Beaver and Bernie Krause, the song tells the story of Krakatoa's eruption and the subsequent return of life to the island.

The British heavy metal band Saxon also released a song about the 1883 eruption of Krakatoa, called "Krakatoa", on the 2010 re-release of its 1985 album Innocence Is No Excuse.

See also 

 Krakatoa documentary and historical materials
 List of volcanic eruptions by death toll
 List of volcanoes in Indonesia

References

Citations

Bibliography 
See Krakatoa documentary and historical materials

External links 

 1883 Eruption of Krakatau from the United States Geological Survey's Cascades Volcano Observatory
 Krakatau, Indonesia (1883)  – information from San Diego State University about the 1883 eruption
  – "Naked Science"
 

 
Active volcanoes of Indonesia
Mountains of Indonesia
Subduction volcanoes
Submarine calderas
Islands of the Sunda Strait
Uninhabited islands of Indonesia
VEI-6 volcanoes
Calderas of Indonesia
1883 natural disasters
19th-century volcanic events
Holocene calderas